Scottland is an unincorporated community in Prairie Township, Edgar County, Illinois, United States.

Geography

Education
Scottland had its own high school during the mid-20th century.  In 1937, Scottland High School graduated its first four-year class.  The high school remained open until 1972, when the Scottland schools merged with the schools in nearby Chrisman.  The high school mascot was the "Eagles".

Info 
The population is approximately 80–100. Scottland is adjacent to U.S. 36. 

Scottland was also home to war veteran Wilma Vaught.

References 

Unincorporated communities in Edgar County, Illinois
Unincorporated communities in Illinois